Mitrella broderipii is a species of sea snail in the family Columbellidae, the dove snails.

References

 Nordsieck, F. (1975). Conchiglie delle Isole Canarie. Parte 2. La Conchiglia. 75-76: 3-7, 22. page(s): 5, 6

External links
 Sowerby, G. B. I. (1844). Descriptions of some new species of Columbella in the collection of H. Cuming. Proceedings of the Zoological Society of London. 1844: 48-53
 Monterosato, T. A. di. (1889). Coquilles marines marocaines. Journal de Conchyliologie. 37(1)
  Gofas, S.; Le Renard, J.; Bouchet, P. (2001). Mollusca. in: Costello, M.J. et al. (eds), European Register of Marine Species: a check-list of the marine species in Europe and a bibliography of guides to their identification. Patrimoines Naturels. 50: 180-213.
 http://natuurtijdschriften.nl/download?type=document;docid=645087

broderipii
Gastropods described in 1844